The 2018 San Francisco Giants season was the Giants' 136th year in Major League Baseball, their 60th year in San Francisco since their move from New York following the 1957 season, and their 19th at AT&T Park.

Events

Offseason
 December 15, 2017 − The Giants traded LHP Matt Moore and international signing bonus pool money to Texas Rangers for minor league RHP Sam Wolff and minor league RHP Israel Cruz.
 December 19, 2017 − The Giants re-signed C Nick Hundley to a one-year deal.
 December 20, 2017 − The Giants traded 3B Christian Arroyo, CF Denard Span, minor league LHP Matt Krook, and minor league RHP Stephen Woods to Tampa Bay Rays for 3B Evan Longoria and cash considerations.
 January 12, 2018 − The Giants avoided arbitration with 2B Joe Panik, RHP Hunter Strickland, RHP Sam Dyson, RHP Cory Gearrin and LHP Will Smith agreeing to one-year deals.
 January 15, 2018 − The Giants traded RHP Kyle Crick, minor league OF Bryan Reynolds, and international signing bonus pool money to Pittsburgh Pirates for OF Andrew McCutchen and cash considerations.
 January 15, 2018 − The Giants signed OF Austin Jackson to a two-year contract.
February 19, 2018 − The Giants signed LHP Tony Watson to a two-year contract with a player option for a third year.

Regular season
April 22, 2018 − Brandon Belt set a new MLB record for most pitches seen in a single at bat, with 21 against the Angels' starting pitcher, Jaime Barria. Belt fouled off 16 two-strike pitches against the right-hander in his first plate appearance of the game, in the top of the first inning.
July 8, 2018 – The Giants acquire a player to be named later or cash considerations in a trade with the Texas Rangers in exchange for OF Austin Jackson, RHP Cory Gearrin and minor league RHP Jason Bahr.
July 8, 2018 – The rosters for the 2018 Major League Baseball All-Star Game are announced, with SS Brandon Crawford being named the National League's starter at shortstop and to the All-Star game for the second time. C Buster Posey make the All-Star game for the sixth time.
August 31, 2018 – The Giants acquire minor league RHP Juan De Paula and INF Abiatal Avelino from the New York Yankees in exchange for OF Andrew McCutchen.

Season standings

National League West

National League Division Standings

Record vs. opponents

Game log and schedule

|- style="text-align:center; background-color:#bfb;"
| 1 || March 29 || @ Dodgers || 1–0 || Blach (1–0) || Kershaw (0–1) || Strickland (1) || 53,595 || 1–0
|- style="text-align:center; background-color:#bfb;"
| 2 || March 30 || @ Dodgers || 1–0 || Watson (1–0) || Jansen (0–1) || Strickland (2) || 53,478 || 2–0
|- style="text-align:center; background-color:#fbb;"
| 3 || March 31 || @ Dodgers || 0–5 || Maeda (1–0) || Holland (0–1) || – || 45,938 || 2–1
|-

|- style="text-align:center; background-color:#fbb;"
| 4 || April 1 || @ Dodgers || 0–9 || Hill (1–0) || Stratton (0–1) || – || 41,866 || 2–2
|- style="text-align:center; background-color:#fbb;"
| 5 || April 3 || Mariners || 4–6 || Gonzales (1–0) || Blach (1–1) || Díaz (3) || 40,901 || 2–3
|- style="text-align:center; background-color:#bfb;"
| 6 || April 4 || Mariners || 10–1 || Cueto (1–0) || Hernández (0–1) || – || 42,582 || 3–3
|- style="text-align:center; background-color:#bbb;"
| – || April 6 || Dodgers || colspan=7|Postponed (rain); Rescheduled for April 28 as part of a doubleheader.
|- style="text-align:center; background-color:#bfb;"
| 7 || April 7 || Dodgers || 7–5  || Goméz (1–0) || Font (0–2) || – || 42,308 || 4–3
|- style="text-align:center; background-color:#fbb;"
| 8 || April 8 || Dodgers || 1–2  || Fields (1–0) || Johnson (0–1) || Jansen (1) || 42,374 || 4–4
|- style="text-align:center; background-color:#fbb;"
| 9 || April 9 || Diamondbacks || 1–2 || Godley (2–0) || Holland (0–2) || Bradley (1) || 36,997 || 4–5
|- style="text-align:center; background-color:#bfb;"
| 10 || April 10 || Diamondbacks || 5–4 || Strickland (1–0) || de la Rosa (0–1) || – || 37,869 || 5–5
|- style="text-align:center; background-color:#fbb;"
| 11 || April 11 || Diamondbacks || 3–7 || Salas (2–1) || Suarez (0–1) || – || 35,041 || 5–6
|- style="text-align:center; background-color:#bfb;"
| 12 || April 12 || @ Padres || 7–0 || Stratton (1–1) || Mitchell (0–2) || – || 22,288 || 6–6
|- style="text-align:center; background-color:#fbb;"
| 13 || April 13 || @ Padres || 1–5 || Ross (2–1) || Blach (1–2) || – || 31,675 || 6–7
|- style="text-align:center; background-color:#fbb;"
| 14 || April 14 || @ Padres || 4–5 || Cimber (1–1) || Gearrin (0–1) || Hand (6) || 41,117 || 6–8
|- style="text-align:center; background-color:#fbb;"
| 15 || April 15 || @ Padres || 1–10 || Lucchesi (2–0) || Beede (0–1) || – || 34,316 || 6–9
|- style="text-align:center; background-color:#fbb;"
| 16 || April 17 || @ Diamondbacks || 0–1 || Corbin (3–0) || Watson (1–1) || – || 19,669 || 6–10
|- style="text-align:center; background-color:#bfb;"
| 17 || April 18 || @ Diamondbacks || 4–3  || Strickland (2–0) || Boxberger (0–1) || Gearrin (1) || 16,976 || 7–10
|- style="text-align:center; background-color:#fbb;"
| 18 || April 19 || @ Diamondbacks || 1–3 || Greinke (2–1) || Blach (1–3) || Boxberger (6) || 18,736 || 7–11
|- style="text-align:center; background-color:#bfb;"
| 19 || April 20 || @ Angels || 8–1 || Samardzija (1–0) || Heaney (0–1) || – || 37,494 || 8–11
|- style="text-align:center; background-color:#fbb;"
| 20 || April 21 || @ Angels || 3–4 || Richards (3–0) || Holland (0–3) || Middleton (5) || 42,666 || 8–12
|- style="text-align:center; background-color:#bfb;"
| 21 || April 22 || @ Angels || 4–2 || Cueto (2–0) || Barría (1–1) || Strickland (3) || 44,544 || 9–12
|- style="text-align:center; background-color:#bfb;"
| 22 || April 23 || Nationals || 4–2 || Stratton (2–1) || González (2–2) || Strickland (4) || 36,983 || 10–12
|- style="text-align:center; background-color:#bfb;"
| 23 || April 24 || Nationals || 4–3 || Moronta (1–0) || Roark (1–2) || Strickland (5) || 37,147 || 11–12
|- style="text-align:center; background-color:#fbb;"
| 24 || April 25 || Nationals || 2–15 || Scherzer (5–1) || Samardzija (1–1) || – || 35,126 || 11–13
|- style="text-align:center; background-color:#bfb;"
| 25 || April 27 || Dodgers || 6–4 || Dyson (1–0) || Cingrani (0–1) || Strickland (6) || 41,936 || 12–13
|- style="text-align:center; background-color:#fbb;"
| 26 || April 28 (1) || Dodgers || 6–15 || Buehler (1–0) || Stratton (2–2) || – || 41,809 || 12–14
|- style="text-align:center; background-color:#bfb;"
| 27 || April 28 (2) || Dodgers || 8–3 || Cueto (3–0) || Wood (0–3) || – || 40,608 || 13–14
|- style="text-align:center; background-color:#bfb;"
| 28 || April 29 || Dodgers || 4–2 || Blach (2–3) || Maeda (2–2) || Strickland (7) || 42,020 || 14–14
|- style="text-align:center; background-color:#bfb;"
| 29 || April 30 || Padres || 6–5 || Johnson (1–1) || Hand (1–3) || – || 35,470 || 15–14
|-

|- style="text-align:center; background-color:#fbb;"
| 30 || May 1 || Padres || 2–3 || Yates (1–0) || Strickland (2–1) || Hand (7) || 36,735 || 15–15
|- style="text-align:center; background-color:#bfb;"
| 31 || May 2 || Padres || 9–4 || Holland (1–3) || Richard (1–4) || – || 36,475 || 16–15
|- style="text-align:center; background-color:#bfb;"
| 32 || May 4 || @ Braves || 9–4 || Stratton (3–2) || Foltynewicz (2–2) || – || 41,807 || 17–15
|- style="text-align:center; background-color:#bfb;"
| 33 || May 5 || @ Braves || 11–2 || Blach (3–3) || McCarthy (4–1) || – || 38,264 || 18–15
|- style="text-align:center; background-color:#bfb;"
| 34 || May 6 || @ Braves || 4–3 || Suarez (1–1) || Soroka (1–1) || Strickland (8) || 37,896 || 19–15
|- style="text-align:center; background-color:#fbb;"
| 35 || May 7 || @ Phillies || 0–11 || Eflin (1–0) || Samardzija (1–2) || – || 17,050 || 19–16
|- style="text-align:center; background-color:#fbb;"
| 36 || May 8 || @ Phillies || 2–4 || Nola (5–1) || Holland (1–4) || Neris (7) || 22,456 || 19–17
|- style="text-align:center; background-color:#fbb;"
| 37 || May 9 || @ Phillies || 3–11 || Pivetta (2–2) || Stratton (3–3) || – || 18,448 || 19–18
|- style="text-align:center; background-color:#fbb;"
| 38 || May 10 || @ Phillies || 3–6 || Velasquez (3–4) || Blach (3–4) || Neris (8) || 30,204 || 19–19
|- style="text-align:center; background-color:#fbb;"
| 39 || May 11 || @ Pirates || 2–11 || Brault (3–1) || Suarez (1–2) || – || 34,720 || 19–20
|- style="text-align:center; background-color:#fbb;"
| 40 || May 12 || @ Pirates || 5–6 || Vázquez (2–0) || Watson (1–2) || – || 27,502 || 19–21
|- style="text-align:center; background-color:#bfb;"
| 41 || May 13 || @ Pirates || 5–0 || Holland (2–4) || Nova (2–3) || – || 22,649 || 20–21
|- style="text-align:center; background-color:#bfb;"
| 42 || May 14 || Reds || 10–7 || Stratton (4–3) || Romano (2–4) || – || 36,156 || 21–21
|- style="text-align:center; background-color:#bfb;"
| 43 || May 15 || Reds || 5–3 || Johnson (2–1) || Mahle (3–5) || Strickland (9) || 37,809 || 22–21
|- style="text-align:center; background-color:#fbb;"
| 44 || May 16 || Reds || 3–6 || Hughes (2–2) || Suarez (1–3) || Iglesias (8) || 38,662 || 22–22
|- style="text-align:center; background-color:#fbb;"
| 45 || May 17 || Rockies || 3–5  || McGee (1–2) || Johnson (2–2) || Davis (16) || 37,224 || 22–23
|- style="text-align:center; background-color:#fbb;"
| 46 || May 18 || Rockies || 1–6 || Freeland (4–4) || Holland (2–5) || – || 40,970 || 22–24
|- style="text-align:center; background-color:#bfb;"
| 47 || May 19 || Rockies || 9–4 || Stratton (5–3) || Gray (4–6) || – || 39,195 || 23–24
|- style="text-align:center; background-color:#bfb;"
| 48 || May 20 || Rockies || 9–5 || Dyson (2–0) || Shaw (1–2) || – || 40,334 || 24–24
|- style="text-align:center; background-color:#fbb;"
| 49 || May 22 || @ Astros || 2–11 || Cole (5–1) || Suarez (1–4) || – || 35,638 || 24–25
|- style="text-align:center; background-color:#fbb;"
| 50 || May 23 || @ Astros || 1–4 || Verlander (6–2) || Samardzija (1–3) || Giles (9) || 31,929 || 24–26
|- style="text-align:center; background-color:#fbb;"
| 51 || May 25 || @ Cubs || 2–6 || Hendricks (4–3) || Holland (2–6) || Morrow (11) || 41,177 || 24–27
|- style="text-align:center; background-color:#bfb;"
| 52 || May 26 || @ Cubs || 5–4 || Stratton (6–3) || Quintana (5–4) || Strickland (10) || 41,250 || 25–27
|- style="text-align:center; background-color:#fbb;"
| 53 || May 27 || @ Cubs || 3–8 || Rosario (1–0) || Blach (3–5) || – || 41,587 || 25–28
|- style="text-align:center; background-color:#fbb;"
| 54 || May 28 || @ Rockies || 5–6  || Shaw (2–3) || Strickland (2–2) || – || 32,409 || 25–29
|- style="text-align:center; background-color:#fbb;"
| 55 || May 29 || @ Rockies || 4–11 || Freeland (5–5) || Samardzija (1–4) || – || 27,348 || 25–30
|- style="text-align:center; background-color:#bfb;"
| 56 || May 30 || @ Rockies || 7–4 || Holland (3–6) || Musgrave (0–1) || Strickland (11) || 29,400 || 26–30
|-

|- style="text-align:center; background-color:#bfb;"
| 57 || June 1 || Phillies || 4–0 || Stratton (7–3) || Pivetta (4–4) || – || 38,119 || 27–30
|- style="text-align:center; background-color:#bfb;"
| 58 || June 2 || Phillies || 2–0 || Suarez (2–4) || Velasquez (4–6) || Strickland (12) || 39,208 || 28–30
|- style="text-align:center; background-color:#bfb;"
| 59 || June 3 || Phillies || 6–1 || Rodríguez (1–0) || Arrieta (5–3) || – || 40,491 || 29–30
|- style="text-align:center; background-color:#bfb;"
| 60 || June 4 || Diamondbacks || 10–3 || Johnson (3–2) || Godley (5–5) || – || 36,542 || 30–30
|- style="text-align:center; background-color:#fbb;"
| 61 || June 5 || Diamondbacks || 2–3 || Corbin (6–2) || Bumgarner (0–1) || Boxberger (14) || 36,925 || 30–31
|- style="text-align:center; background-color:#bfb;"
| 62 || June 6 || Diamondbacks || 5–4  || Strickland (3–2) || Chafin (0–2) || – || 41,042 || 31–31
|- style="text-align:center; background-color:#bfb;"
| 63 || June 8 || @ Nationals || 9–5 || Moronta (2–0) || Strasburg (6–6) || – || 41,591 || 32–31 
|- style="text-align:center; background-color:#fbb;"
| 64 || June 9 || @ Nationals || 5–7 || Miller (3–0) || Rodríguez (1–1) || Doolittle (16) || 37,701 || 32–32
|- style="text-align:center; background-color:#bfb;"
| 65 || June 10 || @ Nationals || 2–0 || Holland (4–6) || Scherzer (10–2) || Strickland (13) || 35,705 || 33–32
|- style="text-align:center; background-color:#fbb;"
| 66 || June 11 || @ Marlins || 5–7 || Conley (2–0) || Dyson (2–1) || Barraclough (3) || 6,023 || 33–33
|- style="text-align:center; background-color:#fbb;"
| 67 || June 12 || @ Marlins || 1–3 || Richards (1–3) || Stratton (7–4) || Barraclough (4) || 5,928 || 33–34
|- style="text-align:center; background-color:#fbb;"
| 68 || June 13 || @ Marlins || 4–5 || Steckenrider (3–1) || Moronta (2–1) || – || 6,075 || 33–35
|- style="text-align:center; background-color:#bfb;"
| 69 || June 14 || @ Marlins || 6–3  || Blach (4–5) || Hernández (0–4) || Dyson (1) || 9,726 || 34–35
|- style="text-align:center; background-color:#fbb;"
| 70 || June 15 || @ Dodgers || 2–3 || Stripling (6–1) || Holland (4–7) || Jansen (16) || 53,433 || 34–36
|- style="text-align:center; background-color:#fbb;"
| 71 || June 16 || @ Dodgers || 1–3 || Wood (2–5) || Bumgarner (0–2) || Jansen (17) || 53,706 || 34–37
|- style="text-align:center; background-color:#bfb;"
| 72 || June 17 || @ Dodgers || 4–1 || Stratton (8–4) || Ferguson (0–1) || Strickland (14) || 49,541 || 35–37
|- style="text-align:center; background-color:#fbb;"
| 73 || June 18 || Marlins || 4–5 || Guerrero (1–2) || Strickland (3–3) || Barraclough (6) || 36,743 || 35–38
|- style="text-align:center; background-color:#bfb;"
| 74 || June 19 || Marlins || 6–3 || Rodríguez (2–1) || Straily (2–3) || Dyson (2) || 37,242 || 36–38
|- style="text-align:center; background-color:#bfb;"
| 75 || June 20 || Marlins || 6–5 || Holland (5–7) || Ureña (2–9) || Moronta (1) || 35,903 || 37–38
|- style="text-align:center; background-color:#bfb;"
| 76 || June 21 || Padres || 3–0 || Bumgarner (1–2) || Ross (5–5) || Melancon (1) || 37,497 || 38–38
|- style="text-align:center; background-color:#fbb;"
| 77 || June 22 || Padres || 2–6 || Richard (7–6) || Stratton (8–5) || – || 40,546 || 38–39
|- style="text-align:center; background-color:#bfb;"
| 78 || June 23 || Padres || 5–3 || Moronta (3–1) || Cimber (3–4) || – || 40,348 || 39–39
|- style="text-align:center; background-color:#bfb;"
| 79 || June 24 || Padres || 3–2  || Blach (5–5) || Hand (1–4) || – || 39,240 || 40–39
|- style="text-align:center; background-color:#bfb;"
| 80 || June 26 || Rockies || 3–2 || Watson (2–2) || Ottavino (3–1) || Dyson (3) || 36,070 || 41–39
|- style="text-align:center; background-color:#bfb;"
| 81 || June 27 || Rockies || 1–0 || Moronta (4–1) || Musgrave (0–3) || – || 36,046 || 42–39
|- style="text-align:center; background-color:#fbb;"
| 82 || June 28 || Rockies || 8–9 || Ottavino (4–1) || Dyson (2–2) || Davis (22) || 37,529 || 42–40
|- style="text-align:center; background-color:#bfb;"
| 83 || June 29 || @ Diamondbacks || 2–1 || Suarez (3–4) || Chafin (1–3) || Smith (1) || 30,981 || 43–40
|- style="text-align:center; background-color:#bfb;"
| 84 || June 30 || @ Diamondbacks || 7–0 || Rodríguez (3–1) || Miller (0–2) || – || 38,117 || 44–40
|-

|- style="text-align:center; background-color:#bfb;"
| 85 || July 1 || @ Diamondbacks || 9–6 || Gearrin (1–1) || Godley (9–6) || Smith (2) || 29,721 || 45–40
|- style="text-align:center; background-color:#fbb;"
| 86 || July 2 || @ Rockies || 2–5 || Freeland (8–6) || Bumgarner (1–3) || Davis (24) || 40,333 || 45–41
|- style="text-align:center; background-color:#fbb;"
| 87 || July 3 || @ Rockies || 1–8 || Senzatela (3–1) || Stratton (8–6) || – || 48,072 || 45–42
|- style="text-align:center; background-color:#fbb;"
| 88 || July 4 || @ Rockies || 0–1 || Anderson (6–3) || Suarez (3–5) || Davis (25) || 48,158 || 45–43
|- style="text-align:center; background-color:#fbb;"
| 89 || July 5 || Cardinals || 2–11 || Weaver (5–7) || Cueto (3–1) || – || 38,766 || 45–44
|- style="text-align:center; background-color:#bfb;"
| 90 || July 6 || Cardinals || 3–2 || Moronta (5–1) || Brebbia (1–2) || Smith (3) || 37,996 || 46–44
|- style="text-align:center; background-color:#fbb;"
| 91 || July 7 || Cardinals || 2–3 || Martinez (6–4) || Samardzija (1–5) || Norris (17) || 39,606 || 46–45
|- style="text-align:center; background-color:#bfb;"
| 92 || July 8 || Cardinals || 13–8 || Bumgarner (2–3) || Brebbia (1–3) || – || 38,855 || 47–45
|- style="text-align:center; background-color:#bfb;"
| 93 || July 9 || Cubs || 2–1  || Blach (6–5) || Cishek (2–1) || – || 38,024 || 48–45
|- style="text-align:center; background-color:#fbb;"
| 94 || July 10 || Cubs || 0–2 || Quintana (8–6) || Holland (5–8) || Cishek (3) || 39,113 || 48–46
|- style="text-align:center; background-color:#bfb;"
| 95 || July 11 || Cubs || 5–4  || Rodríguez (4–1) || Norwood (0–1) || – || 41,099 || 49–46
|- style="text-align:center; background-color:#bfb;"
| 96 || July 13 || Athletics || 7–1 || Bumgarner (3–3) || Jackson (1–1) || – || 41,751 || 50–46
|- style="text-align:center; background-color:#fbb;"
| 97 || July 14 || Athletics || 3–4 || Petit (4–2) || Watson (2–3) || Treinen (24) || 41,970 || 50–47
|- style="text-align:center; background-color:#fbb;"
| 98 || July 15 || Athletics || 2–6 || Manaea (9–6) || Suarez (3–6) || – || 42,098 || 50–48
|- style="text-align:center; background:#bbcaff;"
| – || July 17 || colspan="7" | 89th All-Star Game in Washington, D.C.
|- style="text-align:center; background-color:#bfb;"
| 99 || July 20 || @ Athletics || 5–1 || Rodríguez (5–1) || Jackson (1–2) || – || 45,606 || 51–48
|- style="text-align:center; background-color:#fbb;"
| 100 || July 21 || @ Athletics || 3–4  || Petit (5–2) || Smith (0–1) || – || 56,310 || 51–49
|- style="text-align:center; background-color:#fbb;"
| 101 || July 22 || @ Athletics || 5–6  || Familia (5–4) || Blach (6–6) || – || 44,374 || 51–50
|- style="text-align:center; background-color:#bfb;"
| 102 || July 24 || @ Mariners || 4–3 || Watson (3–3) || Díaz (0–3) || Smith (4) || 40,276 || 52–50
|- style="text-align:center; background-color:#fbb;"
| 103 || July 25 || @ Mariners || 2–3 || Colomé (3–5) || Watson (3–4) || Díaz (38) || 45,548 || 52–51
|- style="text-align:center; background-color:#fbb;"
| 104 || July 26 || Brewers || 5–7 || Hader (3–0) || Melancon (0–1) || Knebel (13) || 40,643 || 52–52
|- style="text-align:center; background-color:#fbb;"
| 105 || July 27 || Brewers || 1–3 || Anderson (7–7) || Bumgarner (3–4) || Knebel (14) || 40,414 || 52–53
|- style="text-align:center; background-color:#fbb;"
| 106 || July 28 || Brewers || 1–7 || Chacin (10–3) || Cueto (3–2) || – || 40,735 || 52–54
|- style="text-align:center; background-color:#bfb;"
| 107 || July 29 || Brewers || 8–5 || Suarez (4–6) || Guerra (6–7) || Smith (5) || 41,312 || 53–54
|- style="text-align:center; background-color:#bfb;"
| 108 || July 30 || @ Padres || 5–3  || Smith (1–1) || Strahm (2–3) || – || 31,725 || 54–54
|- style="text-align:center; background-color:#bfb;"
| 109 || July 31 || @ Padres || 3–2  || Watson (4–4) || Maton (0–2) || Smith (6) || 29,209 || 55–54
|-

|- style="text-align:center; background-color:#bfb;"
| 110 || August 2 || @ Diamondbacks || 8–1 || Bumgarner (4–4) || Greinke (12–6) || – || 22,980 || 56–54
|- style="text-align:center; background-color:#fbb;"
| 111 || August 3 || @ Diamondbacks || 3–6 || Corbin (8–4) || Stratton (8–7) || Boxberger (26) || 27,581 || 56–55
|- style="text-align:center; background-color:#fbb;"
| 112 || August 4 || @ Diamondbacks || 3–9 || Buchholz (5–1) || Suarez (4–7) || – || 38,093 || 56–56
|- style="text-align:center; background-color:#bfb;"
| 113 || August 5 || @ Diamondbacks || 3–2 || Black (1–0) || Bradley (3–3) || Smith (7) || 27,884 || 57–56
|- style="text-align:center; background-color:#fbb;"
| 114 || August 6 || Astros || 1–3 || Osuna (1–0) || Smith (1–2) || Rondón (12) || 40,251 || 57–57
|- style="text-align:center; background-color:#fbb;"
| 115 || August 7 || Astros || 1–2 || Smith (4–1) || Black (1–1) || Rondón (13) || 41,613 || 57–58
|- style="text-align:center; background-color:#fbb;"
| 116 || August 9 || Pirates || 5–10 || Nova (7–6) || Suarez (4–8) || – || 40,035 || 57–59
|- style="text-align:center; background-color:#bfb;"
| 117 || August 10 || Pirates || 13–10 || Holland (6–8) || Holmes (1–2) || – || 41,762 || 58–59
|- style="text-align:center; background-color:#fbb;"
| 118 || August 11 || Pirates || 0–4 || Williams (10–8) || Blach (6–7) || – || 41,209 || 58–60
|- style="text-align:center; background-color:#bfb;"
| 119 || August 12 || Pirates || 4–3 || Rodríguez (6–1) || Musgrove (4–7) || Smith (8) || 41,980 || 59–60
|- style="text-align:center; background-color:#bfb"
| 120 || August 13 || @ Dodgers || 5–2 || Black (2–1) || Alexander (2–1) || Smith (9) || 45,229 || 60–60
|- style="text-align:center; background-color:#bfb"
| 121 || August 14 || @ Dodgers || 2–1 || Dyson (3–2) || Maeda (7–8) || Smith (10) || 46,734 || 61–60
|- style="text-align:center; background-color:#fbb;"
| 122 || August 15 || @ Dodgers || 3–4  || Báez (4–3) || Kelly (0–1) || – || 44,987 || 61–61
|- style="text-align:center; background-color:#fbb;"
| 123 || August 17 || @ Reds || 1–2  || Hernandez (5–0) || Black (2–2) || – || 19,540 || 61–62
|- style="text-align:center; background-color:#fbb;"
| 124 || August 18 || @ Reds || 1–7 || Harvey (6–7) || Bumgarner (4–5) || – || 23,878 || 61–63
|- style="text-align:center; background-color:#fbb;"
| 125 || August 19 || @ Reds || 4–11 || Castillo (7–10) || Suarez (4–9) || – || 22,756 || 61–64
|- style="text-align:center; background-color:#bfb"
| 126 || August 20 || @ Mets || 2–1  || Law (1–0) || Bashlor (0–2) || – || 24,811 || 62–64
|- style="text-align:center; background-color:#fbb;"
| 127 || August 21 || @ Mets || 3–6 || Oswalt (3–2) || Watson (4–5) || – || 24,999 || 62–65
|- style="text-align:center; background-color:#fbb;"
| 128 || August 22 || @ Mets || 3–5 || Syndergaard (9–3) || Kelly (0–2) || Sewald (1) || 28,157 || 62–66
|- style="text-align:center; background-color:#bfb"
| 129 || August 23 || @ Mets || 3–1 || Bumgarner (5–5) || deGrom (8–8) || Smith (11) || 25,584 || 63–66
|- style="text-align:center; background-color:#fbb;"
| 130 || August 24 || Rangers || 6–7  || Gearrin (2–1) || Dyson (3–3) || Leclerc (7) || 39,845 || 63–67
|- style="text-align:center; background-color:#bfb"
| 131 || August 25 || Rangers || 5–3 || Suarez (5–9) || Pérez (2–6) || Melancon (2) || 40,287 || 64–67
|- style="text-align:center; background-color:#bfb"
| 132 || August 26 || Rangers || 3–1 || Holland (7–8) || Gallardo (7–3) || Melancon (3) || 39,260 || 65–67
|- style="text-align:center; background-color:#bfb"
| 133 || August 27 || Diamondbacks || 2–0 || Stratton (9–7) || Corbin (10–5) || Strickland (14) || 38,808 || 66–67
|- style="text-align:center; background-color:#bfb"
| 134 || August 28 || Diamondbacks || 1–0 || Smith (2–2) || Ziegler (1–6) || – || 37,276 || 67–67
|- style="text-align:center; background-color:#fbb;"
| 135 || August 29 || Diamondbacks || 1–3 || Godley (14–7) || Rodríguez (6–2) || Boxberger (30) || 35,626 || 67–68
|- style="text-align:center; background-color:#bfb"
| 136 || August 31 || Mets || 7–0 || Suarez (6–9) || Wheeler (9–7) || – || 39,057 || 68–68
|-

|- style="text-align:center" style="background-color:#fbb;"
| 137 || September 1 || Mets || 1–2  || Blevins (2–2) || Strickland (3–4) || Gsellman (9) || 38,875 || 68–69
|- style="text-align:center" style="background-color:#fbb;"
| 138 || September 2 || Mets || 1–4 || Syndergaard (10–3) || Stratton (9–8) || – || 39,692 || 68–70
|- style="text-align:center" style="background-color:#fbb;"
| 139 || September 3 || @ Rockies || 8–9 || Oh (2–0) || Watson (4–6) || Davis (38) || 43,256 || 68–71
|- style="text-align:center" style="background-color:#fbb;"
| 140 || September 4 || @ Rockies || 2–6 || Rusin (2–2) || Moronta (5–2) || – || 24,727 || 68–72
|- style="text-align:center" style="background-color:#fbb;"
| 141 || September 5 || @ Rockies || 3–5 || Musgrave (2–3) || Suarez (6–10) || Ottavino (6) || 24,790 || 68–73
|- style="text-align:center" style="background-color:#fbb"
| 142 || September 7 || @ Brewers || 2–4 || Hader (5–1) || Strickland (3–5) || Jeffress (9) || 30,916 || 68–74
|- style="text-align:center" style="background-color:#fbb"
| 143 || September 8 || @ Brewers || 3–4 || González (8–11) || Stratton (9–9) || Jeffress (10) || 25,814 || 68–75
|- style="text-align:center" style="background-color:#fbb"
| 144 || September 9 || @ Brewers || 3–6 || Burnes (4–0) || Bumgarner (5–6) || Knebel (15) || 35,388 || 68–76
|- style="text-align:center" style="background-color:#fbb"
| 145 || September 10 || Braves || 1–4 || Newcomb (12–8) || Rodríguez (6–3) || Minter (14) || 35,996 || 68–77
|- style="text-align:center" style="background-color:#fbb"
| 146 || September 11 || Braves || 1–4 || Foltynewicz (11–9) || Suarez (6–11) || – || 35,285 || 68–78
|- style="text-align:center" style="background-color:#fbb"
| 147 || September 12 || Braves || 1–2 || Winkler (3–0) || Smith (2–3) || Venters (2) || 38,156 || 68–79
|- style="text-align:center" style="background-color:#bfb"
| 148 || September 14 || Rockies || 2–0 || Stratton (10–9) || Anderson (6–9) || – || 37,800 || 69–79
|- style="text-align:center" style="background-color:#bfb"
| 149 || September 15 || Rockies || 3–0 || Bumgarner (6–6) || Márquez (12–10) || Smith (12) || 38,204 || 70–79
|- style="text-align:center" style="background-color:#fbb"
| 150 || September 16 || Rockies || 2–3 || Senzatela (5–6) || Rodríguez (6–4) || Davis (40) || 38,824 || 70–80
|- style="text-align:center" style="background-color:#bfb"
| 151 || September 17 || @ Padres || 4–2 || Suarez (7–11) || Mitchell (1–4) || Smith (13) || 23,653 || 71–80
|- style="text-align:center" style="background-color:#bfb"
| 152 || September 18 || @ Padres || 5–4 || Dyson (4–3) || Stammen (8–3) || Smith (14) || 26,285 || 72–80
|- style="text-align:center" style="background-color:#fbb"
| 153 || September 19 || @ Padres || 4–8 || Erlin (4–7) || Stratton (10–10) || – || 31,933 || 72–81
|- style="text-align:center" style="background-color:#fbb"
| 154 || September 21 || @ Cardinals || 3–5 || Brebbia (3–3) || Melancon (0–2) || Martínez (4) || 45,892 || 72–82
|- style="text-align:center" style="background-color:#fbb"
| 155 || September 22 || @ Cardinals || 4–5  || Martínez (8–6) || Melancon (0–3) || – || 45,878 || 72–83
|- style="text-align:center" style="background-color:#fbb"
| 156 || September 23 || @ Cardinals || 2–9 || Mikolas (17–4) || Suarez (7–12) || – || 46,596 || 72–84
|- style="text-align:center" style="background-color:#fbb"
| 157 || September 24 || Padres || 0–5 || Mitchell (2–4) || Holland (7–9) || Yates (11) || 35,428 || 72–85
|- style="text-align:center" style="background-color:#bfb"
| 158 || September 25 || Padres || 5–4  || Melancon (1–3) || Wick (0–1) || – || 36,063 || 73–85
|- style="text-align:center" style="background-color:#fbb"
| 159 || September 26 || Padres || 2–3 || Díaz (1–0) || Kelly (0–3) || Yates (12) || 36,044 || 73–86
|- style="text-align:center" style="background-color:#fbb"
| 160 || September 28 || Dodgers || 1–3 || Ryu (7–3) || Bumgarner (6–7) || Jansen (38) || 41,167 || 73–87
|- style="text-align:center" style="background-color:#fbb"
| 161 || September 29 || Dodgers || 6–10 || Wood (9–7)  || Melancon (1–4) || — || 41,768 || 73–88
|- style="text-align:center" style="background-color:#fbb"
| 162 || September 30 || Dodgers || 0–15 || Hill (11–5) || Suarez (7–13) || — || 41,280 || 73–89
|-

Roster

Farm system

References

External links
San Francisco Giants 2018 Schedule at MLB.com
2018 San Francisco Giants season at Baseball Reference

San Francisco Giants
San Francisco Giants seasons
San Francisco Giants